Texas and Pacific 610 is a class "I-1a" 2-10-4 "Texas" type steam locomotive that was originally operated by the Texas and Pacific Railway (T&P). It served the T&P from 1927 to 1951 before being donated to the city of Fort Worth. It was briefly used for the American Freedom Train in the mid-1970s, and subsequently for the Southern Railway steam program. Since 1982, No. 610 has remained on static display at the Texas State Railroad's Hall of Giants in Palestine.

History 
Built in June 1927 by the Lima Locomotive Works, No. 610 and its class, the I-1s, were the first authentic 2-10-4s ever constructed. No. 610 was a major work-horse for the Texas and Pacific. By the early 1950s, the T&P had scrapped all of their "Texas" type locomotives, except Nos. 610 and 638, with No. 610 being donated to the Fort Worth Fat Stock Show in 1951 and the locomotive sat on display at the Will Rogers Memorial Center. Sister engine No. 638 also survived for a brief time as a display piece in the city of Dallas, but was scrapped after only two years due to becoming a safety hazard after being vandalized, and it was subsequently replaced with New York Central 4-8-2 "Mohawk" No. 3001.

In early 1975, No. 610 was selected as one of the locomotives to haul the American Freedom Train as the bicentennial of the United States. Initially, Richard “Dick” Jensen was in charge of the group rebuilding No. 610, but as the project was running way behind schedule, Jensen was fired and replaced by David Pearson. In 1976, the locomotive was fired up once more, albeit one year late, and it would be used to haul the AFT for the portion of its tour in Texas. The locomotive would swap trains with 4-8-4 No. 4449 whenever it reached a Texas border. for the photo event Southern Pacific 4449 Texas and Pacific 610 Southern Railway 722 and Southern Railway 4501 were all sitting side by side outside the Roundhouse. After pulling the American Freedom Train, the locomotive was leased by the Southern Railway in 1977 for use in its steam excursion program. The Southern Railway re-lettered the locomotive as "Southern No. 610" and operated it for four years, before the railway decided the locomotive couldn't produce enough speed for their needs, and then they started restoring Chesapeake and Ohio 2-8-4 No. 2716 as a replacement. The railway subsequently returned No. 610 to Texas in 1981.

From 1982 it was on display by the Trinity Valley Railfans on GSA property located on James Avenue in Fort Worth. Due to GSA downsizing the property and the resultant need to move the engine, it was transferred to the City of Fort Worth, Texas and moved to the Texas State Railroad.

The locomotive is now on static display at the Texas State Railroad in Palestine, Texas side by side with Atchison, Topeka and Santa Fe 4-6-2 No. 1316. There, the locomotive would often be pulled out of the engine shed using their smaller locomotives, including 2-8-2 No. 30, 2-8-0 No. 28, and 4-6-0 No. 316, and it would then be pushed back inside by the end of the day.

Historical significance 
No. 610 is the only surviving example of a T&P "Texas" type locomotive and the largest non-articulated steam locomotive preserved built by the Lima Locomotive Works. The only other surviving T&P steam locomotives are 4-6-0 No. 316, which is also preserved at the Texas State Railroad, and Ex-Fort Worth and Denver 2-8-2 No. 400, which is preserved in Marshall, Texas.

The locomotive is listed on the National Register of Historic Places.

See also

National Register of Historic Places listings in Anderson County, Texas

References

External links
 Texas & Pacific 610 and the 1975-1976 Bicentennial American Freedom Train
 Texas & Pacific 610 modeled in LEGO Bricks

Individual locomotives of the United States
Lima locomotives
2-10-4 locomotives
Rail transportation on the National Register of Historic Places in Texas
Railway locomotives on the National Register of Historic Places
Standard gauge locomotives of the United States
Texas and Pacific Railway
Preserved steam locomotives of Texas
National Register of Historic Places in Anderson County, Texas